Li Zheng (Chinese: 李争; Pinyin: Lǐ Zhēng; born 18 January 1986) is a Chinese weightlifter.

Li participated in the men's  class at the 2006 World Weightlifting Championships.

References

Chinese male weightlifters
Asian Games medalists in weightlifting
Weightlifters at the 2006 Asian Games
1986 births
Living people
Place of birth missing (living people)
Asian Games gold medalists for China

Medalists at the 2006 Asian Games
World Weightlifting Championships medalists
21st-century Chinese people